The discography of Fatboy Slim, an alias of Norman Cook, an English DJ, big beat musician, and record producer, consists of four studio albums, three live albums, one soundtrack album, two compilation albums, three remix albums, six mix albums, three video albums, five extended plays, 28 singles (including one as a featured artist) and 31 music videos.

Albums

Studio albums

Live albums

Soundtrack albums

Compilation albums

Remix albums

Mix albums

Video albums

Extended plays

Singles

As lead artist

As featured artist

Music videos

As lead artist

As featured artist

References

External links
 Official website
 
 
 

Discographies of British artists
Electronic music discographies